Nihad may refer to:

 Nihad Awad, American Executive Director 
 Nihad Haj Moustafa, Syrian footballer
 Nihad Hasanović, Bosnian writer
 Nihad Hrustanbegovic, Bosnian-Dutch composer 
 Ahmed Nihad, Pretender to the Ottoman throne
 Nihad Đedović, Bosnian basketball player
See also
 Nihat

Arabic masculine given names